During the 2004–05 Belgian football season, Anderlecht competed in the Belgian First Division.

Season summary
Anderlecht were unable to defend their title and finished three points behind champions Club Brugge in second. Despite this, the club still qualified for the Champions League.

The club had a poor run in the Champions League, losing all six of their games in the group stage.

First-team squad
Squad at end of season

Left club during season

Results

Belgian First Division

Champions League

Third qualifying round

Group stage

References

R.S.C. Anderlecht seasons
Anderlecht